Bonny "Mack" Rice (November 10, 1933 – June 27, 2016), sometimes credited as Sir Mack Rice, was an American songwriter and singer. His best-known composition and biggest hit as a solo performer was "Mustang Sally".  He also wrote "Respect Yourself" with Luther Ingram.

Life and career
Rice was born in Clarksdale, Mississippi. In 1950, his family moved to Detroit, Michigan, where he began his work in the R&B field, performing with the Five Scalders in 1956. From 1957–63, he performed with the Falcons, a group whose members included Eddie Floyd, Wilson Pickett and Joe Stubbs. He performed as a solo vocalist in the years to follow, but his biggest successes were as songwriter for other artists on labels like Stax and others in the 1960s and following decades. He began his solo vocalist career at Stax in 1967, recording on Atco Records beginning in 1968.  Rice is one of the few musicians whose career touched both Motown and Stax Records.

As a solo recording artist, he had two chart hits: "Mustang Sally", which reached number 15 on the Billboard R&B chart in 1965, and "Coal Man", which reached number 48 on the soul music chart in 1969.

Songwriter
Rice's biggest success was as a songwriter. Besides "Mustang Sally", which also became a major hit for Wilson Pickett in 1966, and "Respect Yourself", a hit for the Staple Singers, his other songs include "Betcha Can't Kiss Me (Just One Time)", "Cheaper to Keep Her", "Cadillac Assembly Line", "Money Talks", "Cold Women With Warm Hearts", "Do the Funky Penguin, Pt. 1", "It Sho Ain't Me", and "Santa Claus Wants Some Lovin'".  His compositions have been performed by many well-known artists, including the Staple Singers, Ike and Tina Turner, Albert King, Johnnie Taylor, Joe Cocker, Shirley Brown, Rufus Thomas, Etta James, Billy Eckstine, Eddie Floyd, Buddy Guy, The Rascals, The Kingsmen, Wilson Pickett, Albert Collins, Busta Rhymes, Lynyrd Skynyrd, Otis Clay and The Blues Brothers (in Blues Brothers 2000).

Chart hits and other notable songs written by Mack Rice

Later years and death

In 1992, backed by the soul band The Dynatones, Rice released his first solo album, Right Now on Blue Suit Records.  On it he reprised a number of his hit songs along with a mixture of new tunes.

Rice continued to live in the Detroit area.  He died at home in Detroit on June 27, 2016, aged 82, from complications of Alzheimer's disease.

References

External links
 Fan site

1933 births
2016 deaths
Deaths from Alzheimer's disease
Deaths from dementia in Michigan
Musicians from Clarksdale, Mississippi
Singers from Detroit
Singers from Mississippi
Songwriters from Michigan
Songwriters from Mississippi
African-American male songwriters
20th-century African-American male singers